Ricardo Jorge Cecília Batista (born 19 November 1986) is a Portuguese professional footballer who plays for Casa Pia A.C. as a goalkeeper.

Club career

Fulham
Born in Torres Vedras, Lisbon District to a Cape Verdean father and an Angolan mother, Batista started his career with Vitória F.C. in his hometown. In late 2004, aged only 18, he was signed by English Premier League club Fulham. His only senior appearance for them was on 21 September 2005 in the second round of the League Cup against Lincoln City: his team won 5–4, but BBC Sport's match reporter dubbed his performance "disappointing".

Batista spent the second half of 2005–06 on loan to Milton Keynes Dons, for whom he played nine League Two matches. For most of the following season he was on loan to League One side Wycombe Wanderers. He made 35 appearances in all competitions and helped them reach the League Cup semi-final, in which they held Chelsea to a draw in the first leg before losing the second 4–0.

In July 2007, Batista extended his contract at Craven Cottage to run until 2009.

Sporting CP
On 16 July 2008, Batista signed with Sporting CP for a fee of €158,000. He was only third choice during his two-year spell with the Lisbon club, his input consisting of the match against F.C. Paços de Ferreira for the 2008–09 edition of the Taça da Liga (5–1 home win).

Batista was loaned to S.C. Olhanense for the 2010–11 campaign, initially backing up Marcelo Moretto and playing in the domestic cups. After the Brazilian left for Poland he became the starter, as the Algarve team eventually retained their Primeira Liga status; his debut in the competition occurred on 19 December 2010, in a 0–0 home draw with C.D. Nacional.

On 25 July 2011, Batista was banned for two years for doping, after testing positive in a game against Académica de Coimbra held in January.

Later years
After his punishment, Batista represented Nacional and Vitória de Setúbal still in the Portuguese top division. He signed with Angola's C.R.D. Libolo in July 2015.

Batista returned to Portugal on 30 August 2020 following a two-year spell in the Romanian Liga I with CS Gaz Metan Mediaș where he only made four competitive appearances, barred by veteran Răzvan Pleșca, joining Liga Portugal 2 club Casa Pia A.C. on a one-year contract.

In 2021–22, Batista only missed two matches as Casa Pia finished second and returned to the top tier after a 83-year absence. For his performances, he was voted Goalkeeper of the Year.

International career
Batista participated with Portugal at the 2007 UEFA European Under-21 Championship in the Netherlands, backing up FC Porto's Paulo Ribeiro. He made his debut in the category on 14 November 2006, in a 3–0 friendly win over Serbia.

On 6 March 2021, Batista was called up to represent the Angola national team.

See also
List of doping cases in sport

References

External links

1986 births
Living people
People from Torres Vedras
Portuguese sportspeople of Angolan descent
Black Portuguese sportspeople
Sportspeople from Lisbon District
Portuguese footballers
Association football goalkeepers
Primeira Liga players
Liga Portugal 2 players
Vitória F.C. players
Sporting CP footballers
S.C. Olhanense players
C.D. Nacional players
Casa Pia A.C. players
English Football League players
Fulham F.C. players
Milton Keynes Dons F.C. players
Wycombe Wanderers F.C. players
Girabola players
C.R.D. Libolo players
Liga I players
CS Gaz Metan Mediaș players
Portugal youth international footballers
Portugal under-21 international footballers
Portuguese expatriate footballers
Expatriate footballers in England
Expatriate footballers in Angola
Expatriate footballers in Romania
Portuguese expatriate sportspeople in England
Portuguese expatriate sportspeople in Angola
Portuguese expatriate sportspeople in Romania
Doping cases in association football
Portuguese sportspeople in doping cases